Joice NanKivell Loch MBE (24 January 18878 October 1982) was an Australian author, journalist and humanitarian worker who worked with refugees in Poland, Greece and Romania after World War I and World War II.

Biography
Joice Mary NanKivell was born at Farnham sugar cane plantation in Ingham in far north Queensland in 1887. Her father acted as manager of the plantation for Fanning, NanKivell, a company run by the Fanning brothers and her wealthy grandfather, Thomas NanKivell. The family fortune was lost however when Kanaka labour was abolished and Joice and her parents walked off the property virtually penniless. Her father, George NanKivell, took a job as manager on a run-down property in Myrrhee, North East Victoria where Joice grew up. She had wanted to become a doctor but the family was unable to pay university fees and so she helped on the property until she was 26 years old. After the death of her brother during World War I, her father abandoned the farm and Joice went to Melbourne where she worked for the Professor of Classics at the University of Melbourne and reviewed books for the Melbourne Herald. 

She met her husband, Gallipoli veteran Sydney Loch when she reviewed his fictionalised autobiography The Straits Impregnable, which told of the horrors of that campaign. The book had been banned by the military censor fearful that if the truth about the slaughter at Gallipoli were revealed young men would stop enlisting to fight in France.

Joice and Sydney Loch went to Poland as aid workers for the Quaker Relief Movement with the aim of writing a book about the damage that Lenin's troops had inflicted on Poland and were awarded medals by the President of Poland for their humanitarian work. In 1922 they went to Greece as aid workers following the burning of Smyrna. The Lochs worked in a Quaker-run refugee camp on the outskirts of Thessaloniki for two years before being given a peppercorn rent on a Byzantine tower by the sea in the refugee village of Ouranoupoli, the last settlement before Mount Athos.

To help the villagers, Loch purchased looms so that the women could work as rug weavers; she designed Byzantine rugs, one of which is now on display in the Powerhouse Museum in Sydney. She also acted as a medical orderly and held regular clinics for the villagers. For their work in Greece the couple were awarded medals by the King of the Hellenes.

Operation Pied Piper
During World War II, Loch was awarded another two medals by the Governments of Romania and Poland for saving a thousand Polish and Jewish children from the Nazis by leading a daring escape known as Operation Pied Piper from Romania where they were running a refugee centre for Poles who had escaped from the Nazis and the Russian invasion. Subsequently, the Lochs ran a refugee camp for Poles at Haifa. In 1953 they returned to Greece and their tower home and re-established the Pyrgos rug industry in Ouranoupolis.

Marriage
Sydney Loch (1888 – 6 February 1955) was a Gallipoli veteran and a humanitarian worker. He was born in London, raised in Scotland, and sailed to Australia in 1905, aged 17, working first as a jackaroo. He joined the Australian forces at the outbreak of the First World War and served in Gallipoli until being discharged for wounds and illness. He later became a journalist and writer. He and Joice NanKivell wed in 1919. They sailed for England and secured a contract to write a book on Ireland, which was published as Ireland in Travail.

Other honours
In addition to the honours bestowed on her by Greece, Romania and Poland, she was also honoured by Serbia and her home country Australia, In 1972 on the recommendation of the Australian government she was appointed a Member of the Order of the British Empire for "international relations".

Deaths
Sydney Loch died on 6 February 1955. Joice Loch died in her home in Ouranoupoli on 8 October 1982, aged 95.

Selected bibliography

Fiction
 The Cobweb Ladder (1916), poetry and prose for children
 The Solitary Pedestrian (1918)
 Three Predatory Women (1925)
 The Fourteen Thumbs of St Peter (1926)
 Tales of Christophilos (1957)
 Again Christopholus (1959)
 Collected poems (1980)

Non-fiction
 Ireland in Travail (1922) (with Sydney Loch)
 The River of a Hundred Ways; Life in the war-devastated areas of eastern Poland (1924) (with Sydney Loch)
 A Life for the Balkans (1939), the life of Dr John House
 Prosforion -- Rugs and Dies (1964)
 A Fringe of Blue, an Autobiography (1968)

References

Sources
Adelaide, Debra (1988) Australian women writers: a bibliographic guide, London, Pandora

Further reading
 De Vries, Susanna, 'Blue Ribbons Bitter Bread: the Life of Joice NanKivell Loch (3rd ed., 2005)
 Australian threads woven into Greek history, Neos Kosmos (Australian-Greek newspaper) 21 September 2012

1887 births
1982 deaths
Australian women writers
Australian humanitarians
Women humanitarians
Journalists from Melbourne
People from North Queensland
Academic staff of the University of Melbourne
Australian Members of the Order of the British Empire
Australian expatriates in Greece